is a Japanese professional footballer who plays as defender for Angthong.

Club statistics
Updated to 23 February 2017.

References

External links
Profile at Tegevajaro Miyazaki
Profile at Avispa Fukuoka
Thaileague Official Website: Angthong F.C. Players

1994 births
Living people
Association football people from Fukuoka Prefecture
Japanese footballers
J1 League players
J2 League players
Japan Football League players
Avispa Fukuoka players
Tegevajaro Miyazaki players
Association football defenders